Clint Zweifel (born November 3, 1973), is an American politician and businessman who served as the State Treasurer of Missouri from 2009 to 2017. He is a member of the Democratic Party and the most recent member of the party to hold that office. Following completion of his service as State Treasurer, he was appointed as a managing director with Northern Trust, leading a multi-disciplinary team that includes banking, investment management and trust/advisory services.

Early life and career

Zweifel was born in St. Louis, Missouri, and grew up in the surrounding communities of St. Louis County, Missouri, attending grade school in Florissant and Hazelwood West High School in Hazelwood.

The first member of his family to attend and graduate from college, he earned both a Bachelor of Arts degree in political science and an MBA from the University of Missouri-St. Louis. Prior to running for public office, Zweifel was the research and education director for the Teamsters Local 688, where one of his chief responsibilities was advising union members nearing retirement on their personal finances. Eisenhower Fellowships selected Zweifel as a USA Eisenhower Fellow in 2009.

Family
Zweifel's wife, Janice, owns a business in St. Louis. They are the parents of two daughters, Selma and Ellie.

Political career

Zweifel represented the 78th District in the Missouri House of Representatives. He first won election to the House of Representatives in 2002 by a 67-vote margin and earned the distinction of being the only Democrat in the state to defeat a Republican incumbent in that election year.

While in the House, Zweifel served three terms and led Democratic policy strategy and developed solutions to help Missouri families, developing proposals on early childhood education, helping seniors cope with property taxes, and guarding citizen privacy. He was the ranking member on the Ways and Means Committee and the Special Committee on Tax Reform. He also served on the Special Committee on Retirement, the Joint Committee on Tax Policy, and the Special Committee on State Parks and Waterways.

He chaired the Missouri House Democratic Campaign Committee during the 2006 election cycle, leading all Missouri House candidate recruitment and fundraising efforts for the Democratic Party. The effort resulted in the largest Democratic net gain in the House since the 1978 elections.

In the 2008 election cycle, Zweifel won the Democratic primary for state treasurer, topping a four-candidate field which included 2004 nominee and Arnold, Missouri Mayor Mark Powell, former state Department of Economic Development official Andria Danine Simckes and former Kansas City Mayor Charles Wheeler. He went on to defeat Republican State Senator Brad Lager in the general election. He is the youngest person elected to that office in over a century, celebrating his 35th birthday the day before his election.

Zweifel was re-elected as state treasurer in the 2012 election, defeating Republican Cole McNary and Libertarian Sean O'Toole. Zweifel was ineligible to seek reelection as state treasurer in 2016, and announced that he would not run for any other political office that year.

State Treasurer
As State Treasurer, Zweifel managed a team of 50 that invested $3.5 billion in assets on behalf of Missourians. He also led the state’s banking system while spearheading work on retirement security, small business, college savings, military installations and housing while maintaining the state's AAA-credit rating. He served two terms as State Treasurer, winning election in 2008 and reelection in 2012.

Political positions
Retirement security

As State Treasurer, Zweifel served as an ex-officio member of the Missouri State Employees' Retirement System which administers retirement, life insurance, and long-term disability benefits for state employees. His focus on retirement policy and advocacy resulted in legislation banning the predatory practice known as "pension advances" for Missouri public pensioners.

Zweifel also pursued policy to ensure sound financial stewardship of public funds. He worked with a national bipartisan coalition of state and local treasurers and comptrollers to set clearer guardrails around investing public funds. He joined his counterparts around the country to call on the U.S. Securities and Exchange Commission to establish consistent standards around fees and expenses associated with private equity for public funds. It was an important step toward transparency and enhanced financial stewardship of public funds on behalf of Missouri consumers.

Addressing homelessness

Zweifel served on the Missouri Housing Development Commission through which he passed a housing plan of more than $120 million to combat homelessness in the state. The proposal represented the largest commitment to affordable housing in Missouri's history, including for thousands of veterans, school-age children and those suffering from mental health issues. The plan recalibrated Missouri's housing tax credit program to focus directly on developing affordable housing - dramatically enhancing the program's efficiency and cost effectiveness. while refocusing resources for vulnerable populations.

Small business

By working with Missouri lenders and small businesses, Zweifel dramatically expanded The Missouri Linked Deposit Program, which makes low-interest loans to Missouri small businesses. Through his effective stewardship of the program he was able to secure an additional $400 million in lending power  during his time in office to bolster small businesses around the state.

In 2014, Zweifel leveraged his good working relationships with the Missouri banking community to quickly establish a Small Business Relief Fund for Ferguson-area businesses that were affected by unrest in that community.

MOST 529

Zweifel oversaw MOST, Missouri's 529 college savings program, and lowered fees by as much as 80 percent during his time in office, cutting costs for savers and making higher education more accessible for thousands. He also regularly traveled the state to speak with students about the importance of financial literacy and starting to save early.

Electoral history

Awards and honors

Rodel Fellow 
Honor date: January 2012

Honor issuer: Aspen Institute

Delegate to the American-German Young Leaders Conference 
Honor date: July 2009  

Honor issuer: American Council on Germany

Honor description: Served on a 12-member educational delegation to Germany. Traveled to Munich and Berlin to discuss transatlantic cooperation on economic and security issues.

Delegate to the Republic of Korea 
Honor date: August 2005

Honor issuer: American Council of Young Political Leaders

Honor description: Served on a nine-member, bi-partisan, political study tour to South Korea. Traveled to Seoul and Daegu, South Korea. Met with government and global business leaders and participated in U.S. Department of State and Embassy briefings.

References

1973 births
21st-century American politicians
Living people
Democratic Party members of the Missouri House of Representatives
Politicians from Columbia, Missouri
People from Florissant, Missouri
State treasurers of Missouri
International Brotherhood of Teamsters people
Eisenhower Fellows
University of Missouri–St. Louis alumni